Nata per me ("Born for me") is a song by Italian singer Adriano Celentano. It was released on 1 August 1961  Between 1961 November and 1962 February it was the number one hit on Italian Hit Parade Singles Chart for a total of 12 weeks.

See also
List of number-one hits of 1961 (Italy)
List of number-one hits of 1962 (Italy)

References

Adriano Celentano songs
1961 singles
Italian-language songs
Number-one singles in Italy
Songs written by Mogol (lyricist)